Michael Anthony Quick (born May 14, 1959) is an American color commentator and former professional football player. He played as a wide receiver in the National Football League (NFL) with the Philadelphia Eagles for nine seasons, from 1982 to 1990. Quick played college football at North Carolina State University.

Early life 
Quick's family initially lived in North Yard, an unincorporated section of Richmond County, North Carolina, before moving to a public housing project on the south side of Hamlet. He played football at Richmond Senior High School.

Playing career
A surprise first-round pick by the Eagles in the 1982 NFL Draft, Quick developed into a five-time Pro Bowler, selected consecutively from 1983 to 1987. He led the NFL in receiving yards in 1983 with 1,409 and finished second in 1985 with a total of 1,247. On November 10, 1985, Mike Quick caught a 99-yard touchdown pass from Ron Jaworski in overtime (an Eagles team record, and tied with eleven other QB-WR combos as an NFL record), as the Eagles beat the Atlanta Falcons in the game. He retired because of severe patella tendinitis.

Later career
Quick is currently a color commentator for Philadelphia Eagles radio broadcasts on WIP-FM 94.1 along with Merrill Reese. He resides in Marlton, New Jersey.

Quick appears as Coach Ike Fast, an assistant football coach, at fictional William Penn Academy in Jenkintown, PA, in Season 5, Episode 14, of the ABC-TV sitcom The Goldbergs. The episode originally aired on February 28, 2018, in honor of the Philadelphia Eagles' Super Bowl LII 41–33 win over the New England Patriots.

References

Works cited

External links
 

1959 births
Living people
American football wide receivers
National Conference Pro Bowl players
National Football League announcers
NC State Wolfpack football players
People from Hamlet, North Carolina
Philadelphia Eagles announcers
Philadelphia Eagles players
Players of American football from North Carolina
Radio personalities from Philadelphia
Ed Block Courage Award recipients